Sir Safety Umbria Volley is a professional Italian volleyball club based in Perugia. It plays in the highest level of the Italian Volleyball League. In the Italian Volleyball League, the team is known as Sir Safety Susa Perugia, while in the international competitions the official name is Sir Sicoma Monini Perugia.

Achievements
CEV Champions League
  (×1) 2017
  (×3) 2018, 2021, 2022

FIVB Volleyball Club World Championship
  (×1) 2022

 Italian Championship
  (×1) 2018
  (×4) 2014, 2016, 2019, 2021

 Italian Cup (Coppa Italia)
  (×3) 2018, 2019, 2022
  (×3) 2014, 2020, 2021

 Italian Super Cup (Supercoppa Italiana)
  (×4) 2017, 2019, 2020, 2022
  (×1) 2016

Team
Team roster – season 2022/2023

Notable players

 2004–2006  Osvaldo Hernández
 2011–2015  Goran Vujević
 2012–2013  Thomas Edgar
 2013–2014  Mihajlo Mitić
 2014–2016  Christian Fromm
 2015–2016  Denis Kaliberda
 2013–2017  Simone Buti
 2015–2017  Alexander Berger
 2015–2018  Aaron Russell
 2016–2017  Andrea Bari
 2016–2018  Ivan Zaytsev
 2013–2021  Aleksandar Atanasijević
 2014–2020  Luciano De Cecco
 2016–2020  Marko Podraščanin	
 2018–present  Wilfredo Leon
 2020–2021  Jan Zimmermann
 2020–2021  Sharone Vernon-Evans
 2020–2022  Dragan Travica
 2020–2022  Thijs ter Horst
 2021–2022  Matt Anderson
 2021–present  Simone Giannelli

References

External links
 Official website
 Team profile at Volleybox.net

Italian volleyball clubs
Sport in Umbria
Volleyball clubs established in 2001
2001 establishments in Italy